Federal Group is a privately owned family company which operates tourism, hospitality, retail, and a national sensitive freight company but are primarily known for their casino and gaming assets in Tasmania which is described as "a licence to print money". In the past the company has been known as both "Federal Hotels" or "Federal Hotels and Resorts".

The Federal Group is owned and operated by the Farrell family, consisting of Greg Farrell (managing director), John Farrell (director of business development), Julia Farrell (director of interior design), Deborah Lee (née Farrell; board member) and Jane Farrell (board member).

History

Federal Coffee Palace
Federal is the oldest continually operating hotel group in Australia. Its origins can be traced to Melbourne in the 1880s.

In June 1885, a company named The Federal Coffee Palace Company Limited built an elegant temperance establishment (‘Coffee Palace’) to coincide with the 1888 Centennial Exhibition. Seven stories high, it was the tallest building in Melbourne. It had 450 bedrooms and the largest dining room in Australia.

During the Depression of the late 1880s and early 1890s, the Coffee Palace lost significant amounts of money. This prompted its directors to obtain a liquor licence in order to attract more profitable clientele. The original coffee palace was renamed the Hotel Federal and it went on to become the cornerstone of what is now Federal Group.

Over the next few decades Federal operated several hotels, including The Menzies, Savoy Plaza, The Windsor, Hotel Australia, Lennons Hotel in Brisbane and Hampton Court in Sydney.

Australia's first casino
In 1956, Federal bought its first Tasmanian business – the Wrest Point Riviera Hotel in Sandy Bay, Hobart.

During the late 1960s Federal initiated discussions with the Tasmanian Government about granting the Wrest Point Riviera Hotel Australia's first casino licence. The casino was initially conceived to address the seasonal nature of Tasmania’s tourism industry, designed to be an attraction that would entice visitors to the state all year round.

In a referendum held on 14 December 1968, Tasmanian voters were asked the following question: “Are you in favour of the granting of a casino licence to Wrest Point Hotel conditional on the proposed development of that hotel?”.
In spite of having a referendum planned, the Government managed to obtain sufficient votes on the floor of the parliament. They therefore decided to ignore the referendum, and hold the vote prior to the referendum, and the bill was passed as law. This process was also mired in allegations of corruption and bribery, especially with regards to Kevin Lyons, who held the balance of power.

By a slim 6% majority, the establishment of a casino in Hobart was accepted and the Wrest Point Casino Licence and Development Act of 1968 was passed.

On 10 February 1973 Australia’s first legal casino opened with great spectacle. The event featured the largest fireworks display ever seen in the country, and was televised through the Channel 7 network. American entertainer Jerry Lewis was the main guest artist.

The initial response to the casino exceeded expectations. More than 2,000 people visited the casino on the first Sunday it opened. The hotel was booked out for the first 3 months.

However, the reality of the casino soon set in. While it was initially supposed to be an entertainment and convention centre with a small casino, the casino soon took over the building with many poker machines filling the complex. The restrictions around the casino and the presence of poker machines in the community were gradually lifted, until they were widespread. The expected boon to tourism also disappeared as the vast majority of the significant losses at the machines were Tasmanian residents.

Second casino licence
In 1979, Federal Group secured a second casino licence in Northern Tasmania. The Country Club Casino and Resort was opened in 1982 and the adjacent Country Club villas were acquired by the company some years later.

Architects modelled the style and interior design of Country Club on the stately homes of America’s south. Former Chairman Greg Farrell senior had always admired the simple lines of the US Embassy building in Canberra and believed that the Georgian style would work well in the rural landscape of Launceston.

The casino is now surrounded by suburbs and local neighbourhoods.

Other gambling assets 
With the monopoly over the poker machines in the state, and all the data of where the most profitable locations were. They then purchased a chain of bottle shops to attach to these locations.

Controversy
In a 2017, book entitled "Losing Streak", the Tasmanian author James Boyce argues that the monopoly-licence granted to the Federal Hotels to operate poker machines in Tasmania has been at the expense of the best interests of the Tasmania public. The licence has meant that Federal Hotels have earned around $30 million for the past 30 years.

A parliamentary enquiry called for a significant reduction of machines, and changing the deal with Federal Group. It is estimated that clubs only take in 10-30% of all pokies losses, with the majority going to Federal Group, for which they pay a minimal amount to the government in taxes.

2018 election and potential pokie ban 
In August 2017, Federal Group agreed to give up their monopoly on the poker machines, if in return they would receive a reduction in their taxes (which are already the lowest gambling taxes in Australia). The Liberal government also stated that they agree to the presence of the pokies but they will not necessarily grant those licences exclusively to Federal Group.

In December 2017 the Labor Party opposition under its new leader, Rebecca White, announced that if elected they would phase out all poker machines from pubs and clubs by 2023. The reasons cited were the health implications, and that Tasmanians could not afford to lose the more than $110 million it loses every year.

In response Federal Group attacked the plan as dangerous and that it would lead to job losses, and said they would stop donating to the Labor Party. The Liberal Party mostly fell in line with Federal Group, even using Federal Group's own promotional material to attack Labor. Over half of the Liberal Party's declared donations, over $400,000, for the election were given to them by gambling interests.

There has been wide spread support for the Labor policy. The Greens have been calling for the pokies ban for many years, and the Jacquie Lambie Network also coming out in support. Others in support include David Walsh, the owner of the MONA gallery, and major opponent of the pokies. Public opinion also strongly supports either a reduction or phasing out of pokies.

Former interests
 Strahan Village
 Freycinet Lodge
 Cradle Mountain Hotel
 Gordon River Cruises
 West Coast Wilderness Railway

Tourist accommodation
 Wrest Point Hotel Casino
 Country Club Casino
 The Henry Jones Art Hotel
 Saffire-Freycinet
 MACq01 Hotel (2017)

See also 
 1968 Tasmanian casino referendum
 Kevin Lyons
 Rebecca White

References

1885 establishments in Australia
Hotel chains in Australia
Companies based in Tasmania
Gambling companies of Australia
Family-owned companies of Australia